Sanford is an unincorporated community in Stewart County, in the U.S. state of Georgia.

History
A post office called Sanford was established in 1892, and remained in operation until 1905. The community most likely was named after John W. A. Sanford, a United States Congressional Representative from the state of Georgia.

References

Unincorporated communities in Georgia (U.S. state)
Unincorporated communities in Stewart County, Georgia